Senthamizhan Seeman (born 8 November 1966) is an Indian politician, filmmaker and the chief-coordinator of the political party Naam Tamilar Katchi in Tamil Nadu. He is an advocate of the creation of vote bank for Tamils.

Seeman began his career as a filmmaker in the mid-1990s, working on films such as Panchalankurichi (1996) and Veeranadai (2000). The failure of his early films made it difficult for him to attract offers as a director and several of his proposed projects were stalled in the late 1990s. He later made a comeback through the successful vigilante film Thambi (2006), though the commercial failure of his next film, prompted Seeman to prioritise commitments as a supporting actor in the late 2000s.

In the early 2010s, Seeman started a Tamil nationalist political party, and has since often been in the news for his controversial statements on Indian social issues.

Early life
Seeman was born in Aranaiyur, Tamil Nadu to Senthamizhan, member of Congress and Annammal in Aranaiyur, Tamil Nadu. He studied in Government Primary School in Aranayur up to class 5th. He attended K.K. Ibrahim Ali High School from Class 6th to Class 10th and finished his class 11 and 12 in Ilayankudi. He completed his degree undergraduate economics at Zakir Hussain College in Ilayankudi. Seeman has a brother named James Peter. During his high school and college years, Seeman was enthralled with the ideals of the Dravidian movement. He moved to Chennai to pursue his dream of working in the film industry.

Film career 

Seeman took up film direction as a career after being inspired by the films of Bharathiraja and Manivannan. He worked as an assistant director with Bharathiraja and Manivannan. Seeman started his career by directing Panchalankurichi (1996), a village action film starring Prabhu and Madhubala. He collaborated with Prabhu again in Iniyavale (1998), a romantic film which also featured actresses Suvalakshmi, Gouthami and Keerthi Reddy. Seeman's third film was Veeranadai (2000) with Sathyaraj and Khushbu, which garnered mixed review from critics and underperformed commercially. The failure of his initial films made it difficult for Seeman to attract producers to work on his next films. During the late 1990s and early 2000s, he worked on four other projects, Vaigai Karai Oram with Vijayakanth, Anandham with Karthik, Karma Veerar with Sarathkumar, and Sethupathi Cheemaiyile with Rajkiran, but all failed to develop beyond production.

Seeman then made the village-based vigilante film, Thambi (2006), starring Madhavan in the titular role. The film's production was briefly halted following a disagreement between the actor and director, after Seeman raised an objection to Madhavan returning to be with his family for the birth of his son. The film opened to mixed reviews but performed well commercially. His most recent directorial release, Vaazhthugal (2008), received negative reviews and performed poorly at the box office. A reviewer from Sify noted the "execution is tacky and the final outcome is a dreary and boring message film that leaves you exhausted."

The failure of Vaazhthugal made it difficult for Seeman to find producers and actors to work on his other proposed projects, despite his interest in continuing work as a film director. In the late 2000s, Seeman attempted to make a film titled Pagalavan with either Ajith Kumar or Madhavan starring, but was unsuccessful. Seeman then hoped to make the film with Vikram for director Bala's production studio, but the venture did not materialise. In mid-2010, producer Kalaipuli S. Dhanu agreed to finance the project, and Seeman held talks with Vijay to be a part of the film. The actor later refused to work on the project, which prompted Seeman to speak out against Vijay. In 2013, Seeman approached Jiiva, Jayam Ravi, Arya and Vishal to work on the project, but none of the actors agreed to be a part of the film. In 2017, Seeman was in talks with Vijay Antony to feature in the lead role, and then with Silambarasan in 2018, but both actors later opted to prioritise other projects. In 2017, Seeman announced another project titled Kobam with G. V. Prakash Kumar in the lead role. However, despite an announcement, the film failed to find producers and was stalled.

Since the mid-2000s, Seeman has mostly worked as an actor. His notable roles including supporting characters in Pallikoodam (2007) and Evano Oruvan (2007).

Politics and activism 
Seeman has received threat letters for supporting Liberation Tigers of Tamil Eelam (LTTE).

Early political life and Naam Tamilar Katchi 
Seeman addressed Periyar's ideology and caste abolition in the film industry. In the 2006 assembly elections, he campaigned for the DMK alliance, and notably sided with Pattali Makkal Katchi's S. Ramadoss and delivered speeches against the candidature of Vijayakanth. He met with Velupillai Prabhakaran in 2008 when the war between the Sri Lankan government and the LTTE was looming. Following this, Seeman started to speak out against the killings of a large number of Tamils during Sri Lanka's civil war. Seeman's ensuing speech in Rameswaram marked a turning point in his political career for which he was arrested. He was also detained for continuing to speak out in Erode in favor of the LTTE. He was subjected to the National Security Act, passport block and state monitoring.

Seeman was arrested in March 2009 under the National Security act for speaking in favour of the LTTE and was lodged at the Kalapet prison.

Seeman along with several other activists gathered on 18 May 2009, coinciding the end of the Sri Lankan Civil War at Madurai to form the Naam Tamilar Iyakkam, as a social outfit. It subsequently turned into a political party named Naam Tamilar Katchi.

Seeman was arrested at Chepauk under the National Security Act for making inflammatory speeches at a meeting protesting against the killing of a Tamil fisherman by the Sri Lankan Navy. He was detained at the Vellore central Prison for five months.

Political activism (2011–2019) 

Upon his release from a five-month detention at the Vellore prison, Seeman in 2011 actively campaigned for the defeat of the Congress party in the State Assembly elections. He was neutral on MDMK and DMK while extended support to AIADMK. Seeman campaigned in 59 of the 63 places the Congress party were contesting, and the party was defeated in all of those constituencies except for one.

Since the 2011 Assembly elections, Seeman and his party have been actively involved in various causes such as the anti-nuclear Power plant protests in Kudankulam or the attacks on Tamil fishermen perpetuated by the Sri Lankan Navy that has claimed the lives of over 800 fishermen.

During the parliamentary elections in 2014, Seeman has stated that the Naam Tamilar Katchi would campaign for the defeat of the candidates fielded by the Congress, BJP and the DMDK where they are contesting and will support ADMK.

In February 2015, the party conceived Veera Thamizhar Munnani, aimed at reviving and recovering age-old Tamil culture and traditions. In September 2016, Seeman was among some 176 people arrested after "attempting to lay siege to Srivaikuntam dam, where desilting works [were] under way as per a directive from the National Green Tribunal".

2016 Tamil Nadu assembly elections 
Naam Tamilar Katchi contested in the 2016 assembly election, with Seeman as the Chief Ministerial candidate from the Cuddalore constituency. The party contested in all the 234 assembly constituencies on its own, in the elections Tamil Nadu and as well as those in Puducherry. Seeman contested in the 2016 Tamil Nadu Legislative Assembly election from Cuddalore constituency and polled 12,497 votes and lost by a low margin, finishing fifth and forfeited his deposits in the process.

NTK, in the 2016 TN General Assembly election, failed to win a single seat.

2019 Indian general elections 
Naam Tamilar Katchi contested in all the 39 constituencies present in Tamil Nadu, but got only 4% of the vote share, thus losing deposits in all constituencies. NTK fared well in rural areas when compared to urban areas.

Electoral performance

Personal life 
Seeman is married to Kayalvizhi, daughter of K. Kalimuthu, the former Speaker of Tamil Nadu Legislative Assembly from the AIADMK party. The ceremony was held according to Tamil traditions at the YMCA grounds in Nandanam, Chennai during September 2013.

Actress Vijayalakshmi claimed that she was in a relationship with Seeman who she had met on the sets of Seeman's film Vaazhthugal during 2007. In 2011, she filed a police complaint against him for cheating her. The pair continued to engage in a public war of words throughout the 2010s, with Vijayalakshmi later attempting suicide in July 2020, blaming Seeman and his supporters for torture. In 2011, Seeman publicly expressed his interest in marrying a Sri Lankan Tamil woman and chose Yarlmathy, a widow of a LTTE fighter, but later did not do so.

Controversies 
In November 2009, while on a speaking tour in Canada, Seeman was arrested by the Canada Border Services Agency for giving a hate-filled incendiary speech at an event in Toronto. In the speech, he reportedly talked about restarting the civil war in Sri Lanka, and allegedly said "no Sinhala can live," going on to state that the LTTE should have bombed 100 Sinhala schools for every Tamil school which was attacked.

While campaigning for Vikravandi assembly by-election, he declared that his party proudly declared the killing of an enemy (Rajiv Gandhi) for he had sent Indian Peace Keeping Force (IPKF) to Eelam that killed numerous Tamil people. This speech raised criticism from people of various political spectrum. Following this event many charges were booked against him by the police.

The most controversial aspect of Seeman and his political party is that of ethnic purism arbitrarily based on caste lines. He claims the 'decline of Tamil people' is due to continuous rule of Tamil Nadu by 'Vandheris' (refers to outsiders or non Tamils especially Telugus based on caste and history of immigration) and only hope for Tamils is to elect "Real Tamilian" to power.
Although Seeman openly claims to be a supporter of Tamil Eelam and LTTE, the sincerity behind his proclaimed  stance has been questioned multiple times. For example, an audio leak in 2019 confirmed the fact that Seeman opposed a pro-LTTE movie named Methagu despite the movie's well reception among Sri Lankan Tamils and Indian Tamils alike. In another leaked audio, he was caught using profanity against slain LTTE fighter Pottu Amman
In 2013, Seeman invited Kashmiri separatist leader Yaseen Malik for one of his public meetings and drew criticism 

In Feb 2023, during the Erode East Assembly constituency by-election campaign, when talking about the Vijaynagar kings capturing Tamil Nadu, he had mentioned "they brought members of the Arunthathiyar community to this region to do scavenging". He received backlash and his comments also sparked protests by Arunthathiyar outfits. The Election Commission also issued a notice to NTK seeking an explanation. Seeman was also booked by the Karungalpalayam police, registering a case under three sections.

References

Tamil film directors
People from Sivaganga district
Living people
Tamil Nadu politicians
Tamil activists
Indian actor-politicians
Film directors from Tamil Nadu
Male actors in Tamil cinema
Tamil male actors
Indian political party founders
20th-century Indian film directors
21st-century Indian film directors
1966 births
Sri Lankan Civil War protests
Assassination of Rajiv Gandhi
Indian Peace Keeping Force
People of the Sri Lankan Civil War